Kathenotheism is a term coined by the philologist Max Müller to mean the worship of one god at a time. It is closely related to henotheism, the worship of one god while not rejecting the existence of other gods. Müller coined the term in reference to the Vedas, where he explained each deity is treated as supreme in turn.

Etymology

Kathenotheism, a more specific form of  henotheism, refers to the worship of a succession of supreme gods "one at a time", from the Greek kath' hena "one by one" + theism.

Ancient Greece
The ancient Orphic religion had a polytheistic theology. The deities were each distinct individuals that were not equated with one another.

Hinduism
The Smarta Tradition of Hinduism worship the five major deities as supreme in turn and collectively.

References

Theism